Potassium voltage-gated channel, subfamily H (eag-related), member 5, also known as KCNH5, is a human gene encoding the Kv10.2 protein.

Voltage-gated potassium (Kv) channels represent the most complex class of voltage-gated ion channels from both functional and structural standpoints. Their diverse functions include regulating neurotransmitter release, heart rate, insulin secretion, neuronal excitability, epithelial electrolyte transport, smooth muscle contraction, and cell volume. This gene encodes a member of the potassium channel, voltage-gated, subfamily H. This member is a pore-forming (alpha) subunit of a voltage-gated non-inactivating delayed rectifier potassium channel. This gene is not expressed in differentiating myoblasts. Alternative splicing results in three transcript variants encoding distinct isoforms.

Mutations in this gene have been linked to cases of early onset Epilepsy.(10.1111/epi.12201)

References

Further reading